NHMS may refer to:

 New Hampshire Motor Speedway in Loudon, New Hampshire
 Nathan Hale Middle School in Norwalk, Connecticut